Somawangi is a village in the town of Mandiraja, Banjarnegara Regency, Central Java Province, Indonesia. This village has an area of 690 hectares and a population of 7.355 inhabitants in 2010.

References

External link
 Banjarnegara Regency official website
 BPS Kabupaten Banjarnegara

Banjarnegara Regency
Villages in Central Java